Judi Beecher is an American actress, voice actress and filmmaker who is best known for providing the voice and facial motion capture of Madison Paige in the video game Heavy Rain.

Career
Beecher's first professional acting job was with Woody Allen in a string of commercials for Coop Italia. In her early years she was a chanteuse singing next to the Gipsy Kings in Avignon France and busked her way across the South of France to Spain. She is tri-lingual English, Italian French, Italian and conversational Spanish. Beecher is best known for Only in Paris (2009), in which she won the best actress award for her performance of Samantha Tomelson, Taken 3 (2014) starring Liam Neeson, Dany Boon's, La Ch'tite Famille (Family is Family) (2018). She is also plays Jenny Meyers in the new series, La Garçonne (2020) for French television whose producers are also known for Call My Agent. In 2021, she co-starred in Tango Shalom (2021) as Raquel Yehuda, the wife of a Hassidic rabbi.

Filmography

Film

Television

References

Living people
Date of birth missing (living people)
American voice actresses
21st-century American actresses
American film actresses
American video game actresses
Year of birth missing (living people)